Mazowsze may refer to:
Masovia, a geographic and historic region of Poland
Mazowsze (folk group)
Mazowsze, Kuyavian-Pomeranian Voivodeship, a village in north-central Poland
Masovian Voivodeship, a province of Poland